Degtyaryov or Degtyarev (masculine), or Degtyaryova (feminine): 

 David Degtyarev (born 1996), Kazakh Paralympic powerlifter
 Grigoriy Degtyaryov (1958–2011), Russian decathlete
 Igor Degtyaryov (b. 1976), Russian footballer
 Stepan Degtyarev (1766–1813), Russian composer
 Vasily Degtyarev (1880–1949), Russian weapons designer
 Mikhail Degtyarev (b. 1981), Russian politician
 Tamara Degtyaryova (1944–2018), Russian actress

Russian-language surnames